There have been 164 Formula One drivers who have represented the United Kingdom, three of whom have competed in the 2021 season. Ten World Champions have driven under the UK flag. Of those, Lewis Hamilton has won the most titles, with seven putting him level with Michael Schumacher for most titles. Hamilton is still active in the sport; he has won the most races, recorded the most pole positions and amassed the most points of any driver representing the UK.

World champions and race winners

There have been ten Formula One World Drivers' Champions representing the United Kingdom, winning a total of 20 titles between them including the  season. The first champion was Mike Hawthorn, who in 1958 became only the fourth different person to win the title. In the 15 seasons between 1962 and 1976 the title was won by a driver representing the UK nine times: Graham Hill (1962, 1968), Jim Clark (1963, 1965), John Surtees (1964), Jackie Stewart (1969, 1971, 1973), and James Hunt (1976). Despite these successes, it wasn't until 2015 that a champion representing the UK retained their title, when Lewis Hamilton achieved this, following on from his victory in 2014. Hunt's victory was the last title until 1992, Nigel Mansell's winning season. Graham Hill's son Damon won in 1996 before another lengthy period without a world champion representing the UK. Lewis Hamilton won by just one point in 2008, with Jenson Button winning the following year, in 2009. Lewis Hamilton became the fourth multiple world champion representing the UK when he won his second title in 2014.

The British Grand Prix has been won by eleven drivers representing the UK: Stirling Moss, Peter Collins, Clark, Stewart, Hunt, John Watson, Mansell, Damon Hill, Johnny Herbert, David Coulthard, and Hamilton who have won the event 25 times between them. Nine other men representing the UK have also won Formula One races, but never the British Grand Prix. These are Hawthorn, Tony Brooks, Innes Ireland, Graham Hill, Surtees, Peter Gethin, Eddie Irvine, Button and George Russell.

Current drivers
Lewis Hamilton made his debut with McLaren in 2007. He managed to finish on the podium in each of his first nine races: a record which stands to this day. He achieved his first win at the 2007 Canadian Grand Prix and came within one point of winning the world title in his rookie season. He made up for this defeat in his second year, winning the 2008 title by a single point. He continued to race for McLaren until the end of the 2012 season, and won races in each of his six seasons with the team. He moved to Mercedes for the  season and broke what had been Nigel Mansell's national record, with a total of  Grand Prix wins, the most in Formula One. Hamilton has been described as the best driver of his generation, and one of the greatest Formula One drivers of all time.

Lando Norris and George Russell made their Formula One debuts at the 2019 Australian Grand Prix for McLaren and Williams respectively. Russell currently drives for Mercedes, replacing Valtteri Bottas after the 2021 season, and is contracted with them until the end of 2023. Norris is contracted to drive for McLaren until the end of 2025.

Former drivers

Notable former drivers

Scotsman Jim Clark is one of the most highly regarded drivers in the history of the sport. He had won two world championships, missing out on two others due to car failure. He died on 7 April 1968 at an F2 race in Hockenheim after his Lotus suffered a tyre failure. His hall of fame entry on the official Formula One site summarises that "Few champions were as dominant. Fewer still are remembered so fondly." An Autosport survey taken by 217 Formula One drivers saw Clark voted as the fifth greatest F1 driver of all time just ahead of fellow Scottish driver Jackie Stewart.

Jackie Stewart won in 1969, 1971, and 1973. By the time of his retirement he had won 27 races, a record that would stand until finally being bettered by Alain Prost in 1987. Stewart remained highly active with the sport, running his own team and being one of the most vocal proponents for the improvement of safety standards in Formula One.

Stirling Moss has been called the "greatest all-round racing driver" for his successes in sportscars, touring cars, and rallying as well as Formula One. He finished second in the championship in four successive seasons (1955 to 1958) and has therefore been given the title of "the greatest British driver never to win a world title".

Mike Hawthorn was the first British world championship title winner, beating Moss to the 1958 title by just one point. He remains one of only two drivers who won the title with only one race win, the other being Keke Rosberg. Though he won the season he was disillusioned with the sport, having seen Ferrari teammate Peter Collins die in an accident at Nürburgring. Hawthorn had been reluctant to complete the season and quit Formula One immediately after the final race. Just a few months later, in January 1959, Hawthorn died when his speeding Jaguar skidded off a wet road.

Nigel Mansell has won 31 Grands Prix, placing him seventh in the overall race winners' list and making him, by that measure, the second most successful British driver after Lewis Hamilton. He also holds the record for the most races completed in his career before finally winning a world championship. Mansell made his debut in 1980 and came close to winning the title in both 1986 and 1987. He eventually achieved the success in 1992 in some style, securing the title in August, the earliest that it had ever been decided. Mansell left to join CART in 1993, winning the championship in his debut season and making him the only person to hold both the CART and F1 titles at the same time. He briefly returned to Formula One for the end of the 1994 season and the start of 1995.

Graham Hill started 176 races, all of which were in British-built cars. His long career lasted for 17 seasons, ending in 1975 when he died in a plane crash. He won the driver's title in 1962 with BRM and 1968 with Team Lotus. His son, Damon Hill, followed him into the sport, making his debut in 1992 for Brabham. He was described by team boss Frank Williams as "a tough bastard" and went on to win the championship with Williams in 1996. Despite that success he was dropped by the team and moved to the uncompetitive Arrows.

Hunt was notorious for his unconventional behaviour on and off the track, which earned him a reputation for cavalier indulgence in both alcohol and sex. Having been part of Formula One when the series was consolidating its global popularity, Hunt's image was the epitome of the unruly, playboy driver, with a touch of English eccentricity. The movie Rush is centered on the rivalry between James Hunt and Niki Lauda during the 1976 Formula One motor-racing season.

John Surtees was a multi-title winning motorcyclist before moving to four wheels. His 1960 debut saw him qualify in pole position in his third race and he would go on to win the championship title with Ferrari in 1964. He remains the only person to have won world championships on both two and four wheels.

Tony Brooks, a qualified dentist, made his debut in 1956 for BRM. In his first race, the 1956 British Grand Prix, he was involved in a serious crash, being thrown from the car and breaking his jaw. At the 1957 British Grand Prix Brooks was in second place when he was called into the pits. He stepped out of the car and gave it to teammate Stirling Moss whose own car had developed technical problems. Moss rejoined in ninth and went on to win the race. This marked the first world championship victory for a British car, fittingly driven by two British drivers at the British Grand Prix. Brooks retired from Formula One in 1961 over safety concerns saying "I felt I had a moral responsibility to take reasonable care of my life".

David Coulthard came into F1 as a replacement for Ayrton Senna after Senna's death in 1994. He went on to finish in the top-three in the world championship five times throughout his career. Compared to other British drivers, Coulthard had competed in the most races (246) and amassed the highest points total (535) at the time of his retirement at the end of the 2008 season.

Jenson Button made his Formula One debut in 2000 at the age of 20, making him the youngest British driver to compete in the sport until Lando Norris made his debut in the 2019 F1 season. He started his career with Williams, scoring a point in his second race. He would later race for British American Racing, a team that would then be purchased by Honda with whom he would win his first race, the 2006 Hungarian Grand Prix. Following the 2008 season, Honda decided to withdraw from F1, and the team was saved by a management buyout. The team returned as Brawn GP and saw immediate success. Button went on to achieve his most significant F1 successes, winning six of the first seven races in 2009 on the way to the world title. In 2010, he moved to McLaren, for whom he raced until the end of his career. He retired at the end of the 2016 season but raced in the 2017 Monaco Grand Prix as a replacement driver.

Other former drivers
In addition to those detailed above, the following drivers started at least ten races: 

Cliff Allison
Bob Anderson
Peter Arundell
Richard Attwood
Mike Beuttler
Mark Blundell
Tony Brise
Martin Brundle
Ian Burgess
Max Chilton
Peter Collins
Piers Courage
Anthony Davidson
Paul di Resta
Martin Donnelly
Johnny Dumfries
Guy Edwards
Vic Elford
Bob Evans
Jack Fairman
Ron Flockhart
Peter Gethin
Horace Gould
Brian Henton
Mike Hailwood
Johnny Herbert
David Hobbs
Innes Ireland
Eddie Irvine
Chris Irwin
Rupert Keegan
Stuart Lewis-Evans
Lance Macklin
Allan McNish
John Miles
Jackie Oliver
Jonathan Palmer
Jolyon Palmer
Tom Pryce
Brian Redman
Roy Salvadori
Mike Spence
Will Stevens
Trevor Taylor
Derek Warwick
John Watson
Ken Wharton
Peter Whitehead
Justin Wilson

See also
List of Formula One Grand Prix winners

References